Sae Taira is a Japanese karateka. She won the gold medal in the women's team kata event at the 2018 World Karate Championships held in Madrid, Spain. She also won the gold medal in the women's team kata event at the 2021 World Karate Championships held in Dubai, United Arab Emirates.

Achievements

References 

Living people
Year of birth missing (living people)
Place of birth missing (living people)
Japanese female karateka
21st-century Japanese women